Laughing at Life is a 1933 American pre-Code film directed by Ford Beebe.

Plot summary 
Easter, a soldier of fortune and gunrunner, leaves his family behind escaping from the authorities and an American detective named Mason. His globe-hopping escape leads him finally to South America, where he is hired to organize a band of revolutionaries, unaware that they plan to eliminate him when his job is done. Here, also, he encounters his own son, who is on track to waste his own life in pursuits similar to Easter's.

Cast 
Victor McLaglen as Dennis P. McHale / Burke / Captain Hale
Conchita Montenegro as Panchita
William "Stage" Boyd as Inspector Mason
Lois Wilson as Mrs. McHale
Henry B. Walthall as President Valenzuela
Regis Toomey as Pat Collins / Mc Hale
Ruth Hall as Alice Lawton
Guinn 'Big Boy' Williams as Jones
Dewey Robinson as Smith
Ivan Lebedeff as Don Flavio Montenegro
Mathilde Comont as Mamacita
Noah Beery as Hauseman
J. Farrell MacDonald as The Warden
Tully Marshall as Stone
Henry Armetta as Fruit Vendor
Edmund Breese as Cabinet Officer
Frankie Darro as Chango
Otis Harlan as Businessman
Buster Phelps as Young Pat 'Denny' McHale
Arthur Hoyt as Businessman
Pat O'Malley as Detective Agency Official
William Desmond as Military Cabinet Officer
Lloyd Whitlock as World War I Commanding Officer
Philo McCullough as Capt. Valdez

External links 

1933 films
1933 drama films
1933 adventure films
American black-and-white films
Mascot Pictures films
American adventure drama films
Films about mercenaries
Films produced by Nat Levine
Films directed by Ford Beebe
1930s English-language films
1930s American films